Kapila may refer to:

Places
 the river also called Kabini

People
 Kapila, a Vedic sage
 Kapila Athukorala, Sri Lankan politician
 Mukesh Kapila, British civil servant and United Nations official
 Kapila Vatsyayan (b. 1928), Indian arts scholar and Rajya Sabha M.P.
 Kapila Wijegunawardene (b. 1964), a Sri Lankan cricketer

Kapil
 Kapil Dev, Indian cricketer
 Kapil Sharma, Indian comedian
 Kapil Sibal, Indian politician
 Kapil Narayan Tiwari, Indian politician